The Treaty of Purandar (or Treaty of Purandhar) was a doctrine signed on 1 March 1776 by the peshwa of the Maratha Empire and the British East India Company's Supreme Council of Bengal in Calcutta. Based on the terms of the accord, the British were able to secure Salsette.
Treaty was signed between the then Governor General Warren Hasting who sent Colonel Upton and Nana Phadnavis of Peshwa in which British accepted Sawai Madhav Rao as a new Peshwa and Maratha accepted not to recognise existence of French in India.

See also
List of treaties
Treaty of Purandar (1665)

References

Sources
Encyclopædia Britannica - Treaty of Purandhar
Sugden, John. Nelson: A Dream of Glory, 1758-1797. Henry Holt and Company: 2005. 

Purandar (1776)
Purandar (1776)
Purandar (1776)
1776 treaties
1776 in Great Britain
1776 in India
1776 in the Maratha Empire